X-box binding protein 1, also known as XBP1, is a protein which in humans is encoded by the XBP1  gene. The XBP1 gene is located on chromosome 22 while a closely related pseudogene has been identified and localized to chromosome 5. The XBP1 protein is a transcription factor that regulates the expression of genes important to the proper functioning of the immune system and in the cellular stress response.

Discovery 

The X-box binding protein 1 (XBP1) is a transcription factor containing a bZIP domain. It was first identified by its ability to bind to the Xbox, a conserved transcriptional element in the promoter of the human leukocyte antigen (HLA) DR alpha.

Function

MHC class II gene regulation 

The expression of this protein is required for the transcription of a subset of class II major histocompatibility genes.  Furthermore, XBP1 heterodimerizes with other bZIP transcription factors such as c-fos.

XBP1 expression is controlled by the cytokine IL-4 and the antibody IGHM. XBP1 in turn controls the expression of IL-6 which promotes plasma cell growth and of immunoglobulins in B lymphocytes.

Plasma cell differentiation 

XBP1 is also essential for differentiation of plasma cells (a type of antibody secreting immune cell).  This differentiation requires not only the expression of XBP1 but the expression of the spliced isoform of XBP1s.  XBP1 regulates plasma cell differentiation independent of its known functions in the endoplasmic reticulum stress response (see below).  Without normal expression of XBP1, two important plasma cell differentiation-related genes, IRF4 and Blimp1, are misregulated, and XBP1-lacking plasma cells fail to colonize their long-lived niches in the bone marrow and to sustain antibody secretion.

Eosinophil differentiation 
XBP1 is required for eosinophil differentiation. Eosinophils lacking XBP1 exhibit defects in granule proteins.

Angiogenesis 
XBP1 acts to regulate endothelial cell proliferation through growth factor pathways, leading to angiogenesis. Additionally, XBP1 protects endothelial cells from oxidative stress by interacting with HDAC3.

Viral replication 

This protein has also been identified as a cellular transcription factor that binds to an enhancer in the promoter of the Human T-lymphotropic virus 1.  The generation of XBP1s during plasma cell differentiation also seems to be the cue for Kaposi's sarcoma-associated herpesvirus and Epstein Barr virus reactivation from latency.

Endoplasmic reticulum stress response 

XBP1 is part of the endoplasmic reticulum (ER) stress response, the unfolded protein response (UPR). Conditions that exceed capacity of the ER provoke ER stress and trigger the unfolded protein response (UPR). As a result, GRP78 is released from IRE1 to support protein folding. IRE1 oligomerises and activates its ribonuclease domain through auto (self) phosphorylation. Activated IRE1 catalyses the excision of a 26 nucleotide unconventional intron from ubiquitously expressed XBP1u mRNA, in a manner mechanistically similar to pre-tRNA splicing. Removal of this intron causes a frame shift in the XBP1 coding sequence resulting in the translation of a 376 amino acid, 40 kDa, XBP-1s isoform rather than the 261 amino acid, 33 kDa, XBP1u isoform.
Moreover, the XBP1u/XBP1s ratio (XBP1-unspliced/XBP1-spliced ratio) correlates with the expression level of expressed proteins in order to adapt the folding capacity of the ER to the respective requirements.

Clinical significance 

Abnormalities in XBP1 lead to a heightened ER stress and subsequently causes a heightened susceptibility for inflammatory processes that may contribute to Alzheimer's disease.  In the colon, XBP1 anomalies have been linked to Crohn's disease.

A single nucleotide polymorphism, C116G, in the promoter region of XBP1 has been examined for possible associations with personality traits. None were found.

Interactions 

XBP1 has been shown to interact with estrogen receptor alpha.

See also 
 Unfolded protein response

References